is a railway station in Chūō-ku, Osaka, Japan, operated by the private railway operator Keihan Electric Railway and Osaka Metro.

Lines
Keihan Electric Railway
Station Number: KH03
 Keihan Main Line
 Nakanoshima Line
Osaka Metro
 Tanimachi Line (Station Number: T22)

Station layout

Keihan Railway

There are two ticket gates in the east and west. The Osaka Municipal Subway Tanimachi Line is close to the east gate. The station consists of two side platforms and one island platform serving four tracks. The two tracks in the north are used for trains to and from Nakanoshima, and the two in the south for trains to and from Yodoyabashi.

Platforms

Others
There was a side platform, an island platform, and a dead-end platform which together accommodated four tracks before Temmabashi Station was shifted underground.

April 16, 1963 — April 15, 2006

* Demachiyanagi: From October 5, 1989
April 16, 2006 — October 18, 2008

Osaka Metro Tanimachi Line

There are two ticket gates in the north and south. The Keihan Railway Lines are close to north gate. The station consists of one island platform serving two tracks.

Platforms

Surrounding area
Osaka Merchandise Mart Building (OMM Building)
Keihan Electric Railway Co., Ltd.
Keihan City Mall
Hachiken-ya
Osaka Prefectural Government building
TV Osaka
Osaka Suijō Bus Temmabashi Pier
Zojirushi Corporation
Capcom

Adjacent stations

|-

External links

 Keihan website 
 Nakanoshima Line website (Keihan) 
 Official Site 
 Official Site 

Chūō-ku, Osaka
Railway stations in Japan opened in 1967
Railway stations in Japan opened in 1910
Osaka Metro stations
Stations of Keihan Electric Railway
Railway stations in Osaka